Marlise Simons is a Dutch-born journalist who joined The New York Times in 1982.

She has been based in Paris since 1989, covering a range of subjects across Europe and elsewhere.
Most recently she has focused on international human rights law and on trials involving war crimes and genocide  at both national and international courts.

Career 
Simons has worked extensively as a journalist throughout Latin America, where she lived from 1971 to 1989, also reporting for The Washington Post.

For The New York Times, she has reported from Central and South America and the Caribbean on conflicts and political murder, torture and disappearances in Latin America. She has also reported on environmental issues in the Brazilian Amazon.

She currently works for The New York Timess Paris Bureau.  In Europe her writing has covered political, social, cultural and environmental issues and in particular proceedings at international courts and tribunals in The Hague dealing with war crimes, crimes against humanity and genocide.  She has reported extensively on the work of the International Criminal Tribunal for the former Yugoslavia and the International Criminal Court.

Personal life 
Simons was born in Sittard, The Netherlands. She is married to Alan Riding, a journalist and author, with whom she has a son, Alexander.

Awards and nominations 
Awards
 1974 Latin American Studies Association award for distinguished reporting from Latin America.
 1981 Columbia University Graduate School of Journalism Maria Moors Cabot Prize for distinguished body of work in Latin America.
 1990 The New York Times Publisher's Award for a "compelling, stark series of reports on the environmental crisis in Eastern Europe."
 1995 The New York Times Publisher's Award for "authoritative and haunting pieces" about the discovery of a new cave with Paleolithic art in southern France.
Nominations
 1991 Nomination, Pulitzer Prize for Foreign Reporting, by The New York Times.

Books
 Gabriel Garcia Marquez: Conversations with the author Amsterdam Meulenhoff, 1986 (paperback) 
 The Smoking Mirror: Living in Latin America Amsterdam Meulenhoff, 1987 (trade paperback) 
 The Prosecutor and the Judge Amsterdam University Press Pallas, 2009 (with H. Verrijn Stuart) (trade paperback)

References

External links
 News articles by Marlise Simons of The New York Times.
 Foreign Policy, Number 43, Summer 1981, "Guatemala: The Coming Danger"
 Journal of International Criminal Justice, Volume 7, No. 1, March 2009, "International Criminal Tribunals and the Media" (ISSN 1478-1387)

Living people
American women journalists
Dutch journalists
Maria Moors Cabot Prize winners
People from Sittard
Dutch expatriates in France
Year of birth missing (living people)
21st-century American women